The women's 800 metres event at the 2013 European Athletics Indoor Championships was held on March 1, 2013 at 17:40 (round 1), March 2, 17:30 (semi-final) and March 3, 11:45 (final) local time.

Records

Results

Round 1
Qualification: First 3 (Q) and the 3 fastest athletes (q) advanced to the semi-finals.

Semi-final 
Qualification: First 3 (Q) advanced to the final.

Final 
The final was held at 11:45.

References

800 metres at the European Athletics Indoor Championships
800 metres
2013 in women's athletics